Rabbi Dovid Hofstedter is a Canadian real estate investor, philanthropist, rabbi and the founder of Dirshu.

Early life and Career 
Hofstedter was born to holocaust survivor parents that emigrated from Europe to Toronto. In 1993, Hofstedter founded the real estate investment and property management firm Davpart Inc.

Philanthropy 
Hofstedter founded Dirshu, an Orthodox Jewish international organization whose goal is to strengthen and encourage Torah study, in 1997.

References

Living people
Year of birth missing (living people)
Place of birth missing (living people)
Businesspeople from Toronto
Canadian Orthodox Jews
Canadian real estate businesspeople
Jewish Canadian philanthropists